The 1921 East Hertfordshire division by-election was held on 16 July 1921.  It had been necessitated by the resignation of the incumbent MP, Noel Pemberton Billing due to ill-health.

References 

Hertford
Hertford
20th century in Hertfordshire
History of Hertford
Hertford 1921